Īslīce Parish is an administrative unit of Bauska Municipality in the Semigallia region of Latvia.

Towns, villages and settlements of Īslīce parish

Notable people 
 Krišjānis Berķis

Parishes of Latvia
Bauska Municipality
Semigallia